Sherlock Holmes and The Three Winter Terrors is a mystery novel by James Lovegrove. It is a Sherlock Holmes pastiche consisting of three linked tales spanning five years.

Reception
Publishers Weekly praised the book saying the "solid characterizations match the imaginative plotting" while conceding "this isn’t at the level of Lovegrove's best work." Starburst gave the book five stars calling it "Another delightful seasonal treat from James Lovegrove."

References

External links
Sherlock Holmes & The Three Winter Terrors at Titan Books

2021 British novels
Sherlock Holmes novels
Sherlock Holmes pastiches
Novels set in England
Titan Books titles